is a passenger railway station in the city of Funabashi, Chiba, Japan, operated by East Japan Railway Company (JR East).

Lines
It is 26.0 kilometers from Tokyo Station.

Station layout

The elevated station consists of two island platforms serving four tracks. The two centre tracks are used by terminating Musashino Line services. The station is staffed.

Platforms

History
The station opened on 3 March 1986.

Station numbering was introduced in 2016 with Minami-Funabashi being assigned station number JE11.

Passenger statistics
In fiscal 2019, the station was used by an average of 22,763 passengers daily (boarding passengers only).

Surrounding area
 Lalaport Tokyo Bay shopping mall
 IKEA Funabashi branch

See also
 List of railway stations in Japan

References

External links

 JR East station information 

Railway stations in Japan opened in 1986
Railway stations in Chiba Prefecture
Funabashi